The year 1875 in science and technology involved some significant events, listed below.

Chemistry
 Gallium is discovered spectroscopically by French chemist Paul Emile Lecoq de Boisbaudran. Later in this year he obtains the free metal by electrolysis of its hydroxide and names it. This is the first of Dmitri Mendeleev's predicted elements to be identified.
 Phenylhydrazine is discovered by Hermann Emil Fischer.
 Swiss chocolatier Daniel Peter working with Henri Nestlé's company perfects a method of manufacturing milk chocolate using condensed milk.

Earth sciences
 March – Challenger expedition first records Challenger Deep.

Genetics
 Francis Galton publishes The History of Twins, as a criterion of the relative powers of nature and nurture.

Medicine
 March 1 – The Hospital for Sick Children (Toronto) is founded in Canada.
 The weekly medical journal, Deutsche Medizinische Wochenschrift, is established in Germany by Paul Börner.

Metrology
 May 20 – International Bureau of Weights and Measures established by signature of the Metre Convention in Paris.

Awards
 Copley Medal: August Wilhelm Hofmann
 Wollaston Medal for geology: Laurent-Guillaume de Koninck

Births
 January 10 – Issai Schur (died 1941), Belarusian-born Jewish mathematician
 January 14 – Albert Schweitzer (died 1965), German-born French medical missionary
 February 4 – Ludwig Prandtl (died 1953), German physicist
 March 14 – Fran Jesenko (died 1932), Slovene botanist and plant geneticist
 June 20 – Reginald Punnett (died 1967), English geneticist
 June 28 – Henri Lebesgue (died 1941), French mathematician
 July 26 – Carl Jung (died 1961), Swiss psychiatrist
 September 11 – Edith Humphrey (died 1978), English chemist
 October 23 – Gilbert N. Lewis (died 1946), American chemist; first to isolate deuterium
 November 12 – Stanislaus von Prowazek, born Stanislav Provázek (died 1915), Bohemian parasitologist

Deaths
 February 22 – Charles Lyell (born 1797), Scottish-born geologist
 February 28 – Robert Willis, English mechanical engineer, phonetician and architectural historian (born 1800)
 March 7 – John Edward Gray (born 1800), English taxonomist
 March 31 – Friedrich Julius Richelot (born 1808), German mathematician
 April 11 – Heinrich Schwabe (born 1789), German astronomer
 October 2 – Petrache Poenaru (died 1799), Romanian inventor
 October 19 – Charles Wheatstone (born 1802), English inventor
 November 27 – Richard Carrington (born 1826), English astronomer

References

 
19th century in science
1870s in science